Michael O'Callaghan is a New Zealand Paralympian who competed in athletics. At the 1984 Summer Paralympics, he won silver medals in the 1500m A6 and 5000m A6.

References

External links 
 
 

Living people
Year of birth missing (living people)
Paralympic athletes of New Zealand
Athletes (track and field) at the 1984 Summer Paralympics
Medalists at the 1984 Summer Paralympics
Paralympic silver medalists for New Zealand
New Zealand male middle-distance runners
Middle-distance runners with limb difference
Paralympic middle-distance runners